News18 Tamil Nadu is an Indian Tamil language 24 hour news channel based in Chennai.
which is owned and operated by Mukesh Ambani owned Network 18.

See also
 Network 18
 CNN-News18

References

External links
 News18 India's Official website

2016 establishments in Tamil Nadu
Television channels and stations established in 2016
Tamil-language television channels
Television stations in Chennai
24-hour television news channels in India